Frank Michael Kratovil Jr. (born May 29, 1968) is an American politician who was the U.S. representative for  from 2009 to 2011. Elected in 2008, he was defeated in his bid for reelection on November 2, 2010. Kratovil is a member of the Democratic Party. He previously served as State's Attorney of Queen Anne's County on Maryland's Eastern Shore, and he was appointed as a judge for the county's District Court by Governor Martin O'Malley in December 2011.

Early life, education and career
Frank Kratovil was born in Lanham, Maryland, and spent his childhood in Prince George's County, Maryland.  He is the son of Frank M. Kratovil Sr. and Lynnda Kratovil.  Kratovil attended high school at Queen Anne School in Upper Marlboro and graduated in 1986.  Kratovil received his bachelor's degree in 1990 from Western Maryland College. He joined Phi Delta Theta while there and played soccer, basketball and baseball. In soccer, he served as Captain for three years, was named to the Middle-Atlantic Conference All-Conference Team and received the Most Valuable Offensive Player Award and the Homer Earl Outstanding Player Award.  Upon graduation, he was awarded the Bates Prize for the Most Outstanding Graduating Male, the Charles W. Havens Award, awarded to an intercollegiate athlete who "has shown by word and deeds the attributes of charity, altruism, benevolence, and a humane and compassionate concern for his fellow man", and the Carroll County Scholar-Athlete Award. Kratovil then graduated with honors from University of Baltimore School of Law in 1994. He served from 1994 to 1995 as Law Clerk for Judge Darlene G. Perry of Prince George's County Circuit Court.  From 1995 to 1997 he served as Assistant State's Attorney for Prince George's County, Maryland.

In 1997, Kratovil moved to the Eastern Shore and was appointed Assistant State's Attorney for Queen Anne's County, Maryland.  During his tenure as Assistant State's Attorney he served as the county's only full-time Prosecutor and Community Prosecutor.  He continued to serve as Assistant State's Attorney until 2001 when he was appointed as Deputy State's Attorney in Kent County, Maryland.  He also served as the President of the Young Democrats of Maryland from 1997 to 1998, and in 1998 was selected to represent the United States on the American Council of Young Political Leaders' delegation to Taiwan. He was also a member and on the executive committee of the Queen Anne's County local management board.

Queen Anne's County State's Attorney
In 2002, Kratovil ran for the office of State's Attorney in Queen Anne's County and was elected after defeating four-term incumbent David Gregory in the primary and Republican Paul W. Comfort in the general election. Kratovil assumed office at the age of 34 making him the youngest State's Attorney in Maryland. He ran unopposed for re-election in 2006. He was elected by his fellow State's Attorneys to be President of the Maryland State's Attorneys' Association (MDSAA) for 2005. During his time as President of the MDSAA, he pushed for stronger legislation to expand prosecution of gangs and increased awareness of growing problems with drugs and gangs in Maryland's rural areas.

U.S. House of Representatives

Elections

2008

On June 4, 2007, Kratovil announced that he would run for Congress in Maryland's 1st congressional district.  During the February 12 primary, Kratovil defeated fellow Democrats Christopher Robinson, Steve Harper, and Joseph Werner.

Kratovil expected to face nine-term Republican incumbent Wayne Gilchrest, a leading Republican moderate, in the general election. However, Gilchrest was ousted in the Republican primary by a considerably more conservative Republican, State Senator Andy Harris. This significantly changed the race, as Kratovil was now running for an open seat rather than against a long-term incumbent.

Kratovil was initially a heavy underdog due to the district's election history. Although Democrats and Republicans are nearly tied in registration, the district has a strong tinge of social conservatism that favors Republicans. It had been in Republican hands for all but 14 years since 1947, although Kratovil received a significant boost when Gilchrest endorsed him over Harris. In June, the Democratic Congressional Campaign Committee (DCCC) decided to back Kratovil's campaign financially through their Red to Blue program.  Kratovil, who is considered a moderate, picked up a number of endorsements from local Eastern Shore Republicans as well as Democrats. He also received an endorsement from the Blue Dog Coalition, a group of fiscally conservative congressional Democrats. CQ Politics designated the race as "No Clear Favorite."

The November election was close, as expected. On election night, Kratovil led Harris by 915 votes. After two rounds of counting absentee ballots, Kratovil's lead grew to 2,000 votes. Forecasting that it would be nearly impossible for Harris to close the gap, most media outlets declared Kratovil the winner on the night of November 7. Harris finally conceded on November 11.

Kratovil's election dramatized the geographic split that characterizes the 1st District. An Eastern Shore resident, Kratovil carried all nine counties on the Shore. However, he lost badly in the district's portion of Baltimore County, including most of Harris' base in Baltimore's more conservative eastern suburbs. He also lost the district's portions of Harford and Anne Arundel counties on the Western Shore.  The district's voters are split almost evenly between the two regions. Kratovil therefore became only the third Democrat to represent the 1st since 1947. Proving just how Republican this district still was, John McCain carried it with nearly 60 percent of the vote, which was his best showing in the state.

2010

Harris announced in May 2009 that he would seek a rematch against Kratovil, citing Kratovil's vote for the American Recovery and Reinvestment Act of 2009 in its final form.

Kratovil based his 2010 re-election bid on his independent streak in Washington. He was quoted as saying "We can send someone to Washington who is going to continue to be independent and put the interests of the people of his district first, or we can send people that are going to put their own extreme ideological views ahead of the best interests of the people of this district." He also pointed to his overall record in Congress as proof. He was ranked as being in the top ten of independent voting records in Congress by CQ Politics in 2009.

A "Super PAC" group called The Concerned Taxpayers of America paid $150,000 for ads attacking Kratovil, and $300,000 for ads attacking Peter DeFazio of Oregon. Mid-October 2010 quarterly FEC filings showed that the group was solely funded by $300,000 from Daniel G. Schuster Inc., a concrete firm in Owings Mills, Maryland, and $200,000 from New York hedge fund executive Robert Mercer, the co-head of Renaissance Technologies of Setauket, New York. According to Dan Eggen at The Washington Post, the group said "it was formed in September 'to engage citizens from every walk of life and political affiliation' in the fight against 'runaway spending.'" Its only expenditures were for these ads. Schuster was the top contributor to Harris.

The district reverted to form, and Kratovil was defeated, taking 42 percent of the vote to Harris' 54 percent. No Democrat has won more than 40 percent of the vote in the district since Kratovil left office.

Tenure
Despite the conservative nature of the district, analysis conducted by The Washington Post and others found Kratovil voted with the House Democratic Leadership 85% of the time. Major Democratic priorities Kratovil voted for included:

An analysis of major legislation only by Congressional Quarterly and Centerline.org concluded Kratovil was one of the most centrist congressmen in the country.  Kratovil voted against the Patient Protection and Affordable Care Act in March 2010, citing his district's overwhelming opposition to it  and "the overall cost, the deficit impact, and the negative impact that the bill's employer mandates could have on job creation."

Committee assignments
 Committee on Agriculture
Subcommittee on Conservation, Credit, Energy, and Research
Subcommittee on Horticulture and Organic Agriculture
Subcommittee on Livestock, Dairy, and Poultry
 Committee on Armed Services
Subcommittee on Readiness
Subcommittee on Air and Land Forces
 Committee on Natural Resources
Subcommittee on Insular Affairs, Oceans and Wildlife

Electoral history

Judicial career
In late December 2011, Maryland Governor Martin O'Malley appointed Kratovil as a judge for the Queen Anne's County District Court. Kratovil had been nominated by the Trial Courts Judicial Nominating Commission to fill a vacancy due to the retirement of Judge John T. Clark III.

References

External links
 Frank Kratovil for U.S. Congress official campaign site
 
 Profile from the Democratic Congressional Campaign Committee (DCCC)
 Maryland State's Attorneys' Association (MSAA)
 National District Attorneys Association (NDAA)
 Queen Anne's County Community Partnerships for Children (Local Management Board)
 

|-

|-

1968 births
21st-century American politicians
American Episcopalians
American prosecutors
Democratic Party members of the United States House of Representatives from Maryland
Living people
Maryland state court judges
People from Kent County, Maryland
People from Lanham, Maryland
People from Stevensville, Maryland
People from Upper Marlboro, Maryland
State's attorneys in Maryland
University of Baltimore School of Law alumni